Jaume Mas was the Bishop of Vic in Tarragona, Spain (1674–1684).

References

17th-century Roman Catholic bishops in Spain
Bishops of Vic